Sahler Stone House and Dutch Barn is a historic home and Dutch barn located at Rochester in Ulster County, New York.  The house was built about 1780 and is a five-bay, -story linear plan stone and frame gable ended house. It was restored in 1957. The 1-story Dutch barn has a corrugated metal roof and clapboard siding.

It was listed on the National Register of Historic Places in 1999.

References

Houses on the National Register of Historic Places in New York (state)
Houses completed in 1780
Houses in Ulster County, New York
National Register of Historic Places in Ulster County, New York